Stadion metro station is on the red line of the Stockholm metro, located near the Stockholms Stadion in the district of Östermalm, Stockholm, Sweden.  The station was opened on 30 September 1973 as part of the extension from Östermalmstorg to Tekniska högskolan.

References

External links
Images of Stadion

Red line (Stockholm metro) stations
Railway stations opened in 1973
1973 establishments in Sweden